Technoport may refer to:

 Technoport Fukui Stadium in Fukui, Japan
 The "Technoport" power station in Pagny-le-Château, France
 The Technoport Schlassgoart business centre in Esch-sur-Alzette, Luxembourg